The Departmental Council of Hérault is the deliberative assembly of the Hérault department in the region of Occitanie. It consists of 50 members (general councilors) from 25 cantons and its headquarters are in Montpellier.

The President of the General Council is Kléber Mesquida.

Vice-Presidents 
The President of the Departmental Council is assisted by 15 vice-presidents chosen from among the departmental advisers. Each of them has a delegation of authority.

References 

Hérault
Hérault